Hsu Hung-chi or Xu Hongji (1934–1984) was a Taiwanese martial artist who specialized in the Neijia of xingyiquan, baguazhang and taijiquan.  

Hsu was born in Taihoku, Taihoku Prefecture, in 1934 to a family of six brothers.  In school, he was very athletic and participated in swimming, soccer and judo. He began his study of Shaolin kung fu with his father at an early age.  He also learned boxing and became a skilled street fighter. After studying the external styles of shaolin for many years, he discovered the unique effectiveness of the neijia and began training with Hung I-Hsiang, a master of all three of the major Chinese internal arts, xingyiquan, baguazhang and taijiquan. 

After many years of training, Hsu opened his own martial arts school.  Hsu's school used a modified version of the Tang Shou Tao (唐手道; lit. Chinese Hand Way) system developed by his teacher Hung I-hsiang.  Hsu named his school Shen Long Tang Shou Tao (神龙唐手道; lit. Spirit Dragon Chinese Hand Way). Tang Shou Tao is not a separate style of martial art, but rather a practical, step-by-step, systematic approach to learning internal martial arts and developing highly refined levels of skill. 

It incorporates elements of all three of the internal arts (xingyi, bagua, taiji) as well as Shaolin kung fu and qigong. Although he incorporated elements learned from other teachers, Hsu's Tang Shou Tao curriculum was very similar to Hung's.

Hsu felt that if a person, no matter what their race or nationality, sincerely wanted to learn and was willing to work hard, then he would teach them.  In the late 1960s he began teaching American and Japanese students in Taiwan.  This led to his falling out of grace with many of his fellow Chinese, including his teacher Hung I-hsiang, even though Hsu was one of Hung's senior students at the time.

For many years, Hsu went to teach in Japan every year and several of his Japanese students opened schools there, Senga Masaki being perhaps the most well known. He had several long-term American students in Taiwan, many of which now have schools in the United States, including Vince Black, James McNeil, Mike Patterson, Harold Bellamy, Mike Bingo, John Price, Thomas Snowden, Dale Shigenaga, Charles Alsip and Pam Holder. He also had several grand students that also now have schools of their own in the United States including Steven Baugh, Tom Bisio, Anthony Franklin, Mark Kimzey, Alex Shpigel and Steve Cotter, among others. As well as great grand students including Read Wall and Danny Motta among others.

References
 Miller, Dan, Pa Kua Chang Journal, Vol. 5 no, 4

Links to Websites of Hsu Hung-Chi's Students
 Shen Lung Tang Shou Tao John Price
 Hsing-I Martial Arts Institute (Mike Patterson)
 Little Nine Heaven Kung Fu School (James McNeil)
 New York Internal Arts (Tom Bisio)
 American Tang Shou Tao Association (Dale Shigenaga)
 North American Tang Shou Tao Association (Vince Black)
 The Sin Lung Kwoon (Mike Bingo)
 Lohan School of Shaolin (Steven Baugh)
 AiBukan Dojo (Thomas Snowden)
 Saint Louis School of Xing Yi (Mark Kimzey)
 Kingdom Warrior Academy Of Martial Arts (Dr. Read Wall, DPT)

1934 births
1984 deaths
Sportspeople from Taipei